The 1992–93 NBA season was the Spurs' 17th season in the National Basketball Association, and 26th season as a franchise. During the off-season, the Spurs acquired Dale Ellis from the Milwaukee Bucks, signed free agents Vinny Del Negro and undrafted rookie guard Lloyd Daniels, and re-signed Avery Johnson after a brief stint with the Houston Rockets. However, prior to the start of the season, Terry Cummings suffered a serious knee injury during a pick-up game, and only played in the final eight games of the season. The Spurs struggled with a 9–11 start to the season as new head coach Jerry Tarkanian was fired. After playing one game under assistant Rex Hughes, the team hired John Lucas II as their new coach. At midseason, the team traded Sidney Green to the Charlotte Hornets in exchange for J.R. Reid. Under Lucas, the Spurs would play solid basketball posting a 10-game winning streak in January, then winning eight straight games in February, as they held a 34–15 record at the All-Star break. However, they would play below .500 for the remainder of the season, finishing second in the Midwest Division with a 49–33 record.

David Robinson averaged 23.4 points, 11.7 rebounds, 3.7 assists, 1.5 steals and 3.2 blocks per game, and was named to the All-NBA Third Team, and NBA All-Defensive First Team, and also finished in sixth place in Most Valuable Player voting, and tied in second place in Defensive Player of the Year voting. In addition, Sean Elliott finished second on the team in scoring averaging 17.2 points per game, while Ellis provided them with 16.7 points per game. Antoine Carr averaged 13.1 points and 5.5 rebounds per game, while Daniels contributed 9.1 points per game off the bench, and Johnson averaged 8.7 points and 7.5 assists per game. Robinson and Elliott were both selected for the 1993 NBA All-Star Game.

In the playoffs, the Spurs defeated the 4th-seeded Portland Trail Blazers three games to one in the Western Conference First Round, but lost in six games to regular season MVP Charles Barkley and the Phoenix Suns in the Western Conference Semi-finals. The Suns would reach the NBA Finals, but would lose to the 2-time defending champion Chicago Bulls in six games. It was also the Spurs' final year playing at the HemisFair Arena. 

Following the season, Elliott was traded to the Detroit Pistons, and Johnson signed as a free agent with the Golden State Warriors.

Draft picks

Roster

Regular season

Season standings

y – clinched division title
x – clinched playoff spot

z – clinched division title
y – clinched division title
x – clinched playoff spot

Record vs. opponents

Game log

Playoffs

|- align="center" bgcolor="#ccffcc"
| 1
| April 29
| @ Portland
| W 87–86
| Sean Elliott (18)
| David Robinson (15)
| Elliott, Johnson (7)
| Memorial Coliseum12,888
| 1–0
|- align="center" bgcolor="#ffcccc"
| 2
| May 1
| @ Portland
| L 96–105
| Robinson, Cummings (15)
| David Robinson (14)
| Avery Johnson (6)
| Memorial Coliseum12,888
| 1–1
|- align="center" bgcolor="#ccffcc"
| 3
| May 5
| Portland
| W 107–101
| David Robinson (26)
| David Robinson (14)
| Avery Johnson (6)
| HemisFair Arena16,057
| 2–1
|- align="center" bgcolor="#ccffcc"
| 4
| May 7
| Portland
| W 100–97 (OT)
| Dale Ellis (21)
| David Robinson (17)
| David Robinson (11)
| HemisFair Arena16,057
| 3–1
|-

|- align="center" bgcolor="#ffcccc"
| 1
| May 11
| @ Phoenix
| L 89–98
| David Robinson (32)
| David Robinson (10)
| Vinny Del Negro (6)
| America West Arena19,023
| 0–1
|- align="center" bgcolor="#ffcccc"
| 2
| May 13
| @ Phoenix
| L 103–109
| David Robinson (27)
| David Robinson (10)
| three players tied (6)
| America West Arena19,023
| 0–2
|- align="center" bgcolor="#ccffcc"
| 3
| May 15
| Phoenix
| W 111–96
| Antoine Carr (21)
| Johnson, Robinson (8)
| Avery Johnson (15)
| HemisFair Arena16,057
| 1–2
|- align="center" bgcolor="#ccffcc"
| 4
| May 16
| Phoenix
| W 117–103
| David Robinson (36)
| David Robinson (16)
| Avery Johnson (12)
| HemisFair Arena16,057
| 2–2
|- align="center" bgcolor="#ffcccc"
| 5
| May 18
| @ Phoenix
| L 97–109
| David Robinson (24)
| David Robinson (8)
| Avery Johnson (15)
| America West Arena19,023
| 2–3
|- align="center" bgcolor="#ffcccc"
| 6
| May 20
| Phoenix
| L 100–102
| David Robinson (22)
| David Robinson (14)
| Avery Johnson (10)
| HemisFair Arena16,057
| 2–4
|-

Player statistics

Season

Playoffs

Awards and records
David Robinson, NBA All-Star
David Robinson, All-NBA Third Team
David Robinson, NBA All-Defensive Second Team
Sean Elliott, NBA All-Star

Transactions

References

See also
1992–93 NBA season

San Antonio Spurs seasons
San Antonio
San Antonio
San Antonio